The St. Maron's Cathedral، also called St Maroun’s Cathedral, is a historic cathedral affiliated with the Maronite rite of the Catholic Church, located in Redfern, in the city of Sydney, New South Wales, Australia. It is not to be confused with St Mary's Cathedral, Sydney, the cathedral of the Latin rite Roman Catholic Archdiocese of Sydney.

It is the main temple of the Maronite Catholic Eparchy of Saint Maron of Sydney (Eparchia Sancti Maronis Sydneyensis Maronitarum) which was created in 1973 through the bull "Illo fretis Concilii" by Pope Paul VI.

It is under the pastoral responsibility of Bishop Antoine Tarabay. It offers religious services in English and Arabic.

See also
Catholicism in Australia
St. Maron

References

Eastern Catholic cathedrals in Australia
Cathedrals in Sydney
Maronite cathedrals